Karl Wilhelm Wach (also Carl Wilhelm or Wilhelm Wach) (11 September 1787 – 24 November 1845) was a German painter.

Life 
Wach was born in Berlin in 1787, studied art at the Prussian Academy of Arts and was a pupil of painter Karl Kretschmar. At the age of just 20, Wach was commissioned to paint an altar piece for the Paretz village church and produced his "Christ with four Apostles" (1807).

Five years later came his artistic breakthrough, his painting of Königin Luise (1812). After spending 1813 to 1815 in the Prussian army, Wach then established himself in Paris. He met William Hensel and the two became pupils of the painters Antoine Jean Gros and Jacques-Louis David. In 1817 Wach undertook a longer study trip to Italy, above all  to study artists from Quattrocento. His strongest influence – according to his own statements – was however Raphael. Two years later Wach returned to Berlin (1819) and set himself up himself as a freelance artist. His first large commission was a picture for Berlin Concert Hall. Wach created for it a cover painting of the nine Muses. 
Prussian king Frederick William III made available to Wach premises in which he then furnished a studio. Due to its influence and its many pupils, this studio soon became a school. By 1837 it had nearly 70 pupils, almost all of whom went on to forge artistic careers. His activity as a teacher did not noticeably impair his artistic work. Wach was honoured with the title professor and appointed a member of Prussian Academy of Arts (1820). To mark his 40th birthday Wach was officially promoted to royal painter (1827).

Wach died in 1845.

Selected works

 Christ with four Apostles (1807)
 Königin Luise (1812)
 The Communion and the Auferstehung Christ (in the Evangelist church of St Peter & Paul, Moscow)
 The beautiful Velletrinerin, (1820)  
 Madonna picture (1826, for Prince Frederik of the Netherlands) 
 The Three Himmlischen Virtues (1830, in Friedrichswerder Church in Berlin)
 Carl von Clausewitz (1830) 
 Christ at the oil mountain 
 Psyche of Amor surprise 
 A life-large Nymphe
 Bildnis Bettina von Savigny (1834)  
 Johannes in the desert (1838) 
 Judith with the head of the Holofernes (1838)
 Königin Elisabeth von Preußen (1840)

References
 Biography (in German)

External links
 Bildnis Bettina von Savigny (1834) at Artnet
 The beautiful Velletrinerin at Artnet
 Christ at the oil mountain at Artnet

19th-century German painters
19th-century male artists
German male painters
1787 births
1845 deaths
Pupils of Antoine-Jean Gros
Pupils of Jacques-Louis David
Artists from Berlin